Painkiller is an upcoming American drama limited series made for Netflix and created by Micah Fitzerman-Blue and Noah Harpster. The six-episode series, which is based on Patrick Radden Keefe's New Yorker article "The Family That Built an Empire of Pain" and Pain Killer: An Empire of Deceit and the Origin of America’s Opioid Epidemic by Barry Meier, will focus on the birth of the opioid crisis with an emphasis on Purdue Pharma, the manufacturer of OxyContin.

Cast and characters 
 Uzo Aduba as Edie
 Matthew Broderick as Richard Sackler
 Sam Anderson as Raymond Sackler
 Taylor Kitsch as Glen Kryger
 Carolina Bartczak as Lily Kryger
 Tyler Ritter as John Brownlee
 John Ales as Dr. Gregory Fitzgibbons
 Ron Lea as Bill Havens
 Ana Cruz Kayne as Brianna Ortiz
 West Duchovny as Shannon Schaeffer
 Jack Mulhern as Tyler Kryger
 Dina Shihabi as Britt
 John Rothman as Mortimer Sackler

Episodes

Production 
Production began in Toronto in April 2021 and wrapped in November 2021. The series was directed by Peter Berg.

References

External links 
 
 

2020s American drama television miniseries

English-language Netflix original programming
Television shows about drugs
Television shows filmed in Toronto
Works based on periodical articles
Upcoming Netflix original programming
Upcoming drama television series